Rouleur is a British cycling magazine first published in 2006 by sportswear brand Rapha and later as a part of Gruppo Media Ltd. The magazine's main focus is road racing but there have been excursions into areas such as cyclo-cross and track racing. 
 
Every year in November the magazine hosts the Rouleur Live, an exhibition of new bicycle models, accessories and apparel with guests speakers.

Content
The magazine is edited by Edward Pickering with Richard Windsor as digital editor. Art direction is by Enric Adell.
Staff writer is Rachel Jary. Contributors include Matt Seaton, Morten Okbo, Ned Boulting, Paul Fournel and Jorgen Leth among others.

Reception
The magazine was named the Cycling Media Awards Magazine of the year in 2015 and 2016 and won the PPA Independent Publisher Awards Digital Initiative of the Year in 2017.

References

External links 
 

Cycling magazines published in the United Kingdom
Eight times annually magazines published in the United Kingdom
Magazines established in 2006